Niemstów may refer to the following places in Poland:
Niemstów, Lower Silesian Voivodeship (south-west Poland)
Niemstów, Subcarpathian Voivodeship (south-east Poland)